Mithilesh Chaturvedi (15 October 1954 – 3 August 2022) was an Indian film and theatre actor.

Biography
Chaturvedi worked in Koi... Mil Gaya,  Gadar: Ek Prem Katha, Krrish, Satya, Mohalla Assi, and web series like Scam 1992: The Harshad Mehta Story. He has performed with directors including Prem Tiwari, Kunwar Kalyan Singh, Bansi Kaul, Surya Mohan Kulshrestha, Dina Nath, Urmil Thapliyal, and Anupam Kher.

Filmography

References

External links

1954 births
2022 deaths
20th-century Indian male actors
21st-century Indian male actors
Male actors from Lucknow
Male actors in Hindi cinema
Indian male film actors
Indian male stage actors